Anna Capodaglio (pseudonym of Anna Adele Alberta Gramatica; 19 September 1879 – 29 June 1961) was an Italian actress. She appeared in more than twenty films from 1936 to 1945. Her sisters Emma Gramatica and Irma Gramatica were both actresses. The actress Wanda Capodaglio was her sister-in-law (the sister of her husband Ruggero Capodaglio).

Selected filmography

References

External links 

1879 births
1961 deaths
Italian film actresses